Uniformity is a term referring to the traditional phenomenon and political thought about the uniformity of various systems in the land of China since the Western Zhou Dynasty, including the uniformity of the calendar, the uniformity of decrees, the uniformity of thought, the uniformity of etiquette, the uniformity of metrology, and the uniformity of writing system.

References 

Conformity